This is a list of the Rulers of baTawana, a territory in the present-day northern half of Botswana, formerly part of the Bechuanaland Protectorate.

Kgôsikgolo = Paramount Chief

See also
Botswana
Heads of state of Botswana
Heads of government of Botswana
List of commissioners of Bechuanaland
Rulers of baKgatla
Rulers of baKwêna
Rulers of Balete (baMalete)
Rulers of baNgwaketse
Rulers of Bangwato (bamaNgwato)
Rulers of baRôlông
Rulers of baTlôkwa
Lists of office-holders

Sources
http://www.rulers.org/botstrad.html

Botswana chiefs
Rulers of Tawana